Terellia clarissima is a species of tephritid or fruit flies in the genus Terellia of the family Tephritidae.

Distribution
Ukraine.

References

Tephritinae
Insects described in 1987
Diptera of Europe